Manfra are French bandes dessinées that draw inspiration from Japanese manga.

Nomenclature 
They are also known as franga, manga français and global manga (the latter a more general term that includes other Western manga-inspired comics).

Characteristics 
Most Manfra, such as Radiant, Dreamland, Dofus, Debaser, etc. have a format similar to that of manga, but can be read left-to-right, such as with Wakfu, or right-to-left, such as with Radiant. Most if not all of the works that are generally designated as Manfra have an art style inspired by manga. Some Manfra, such as La Rose Ecarlate, have an art style inspired from manga while still being read left-to-right and having a hardcover bande dessinee format. Their stories sometimes reference those of manga as well.

Publishers 
 Ankama Éditions
 Dargaud
 Delcourt
 Glénat
 Les Humanoïdes Associés
 Kami
 Ki-oon
 Pika Édition
 Taifu Comics

Works 
 Actor's Studio (fr)
 Amilova (fr)
 Amour Sucré
 Appartement 44
 BB Project (fr)
 La Belle et la Bête (Delcourt) by Patrick Sobral
 Bubble Gôm Gôm (Oktoprod editions) by Cyb
 Burning Tattoo by Emmanuel Nhieu (Ankama Éditions)
 Cassius (Kami) by Saïd Sassine
 Catacombes (fr)
 Celle que... (fr)
 City Hall (fr)
 Debaser (fr)
 Dofus, Dofus Arena and Dofus Monster (fr)
 Dreamland (fr)
 Dys (fr)
 ElementR
 L'Équipe Z (Kotoji Éditions) by Ed Tourriol, Dan Fernandes and Albert Carreres
 L'Escouade des ombres (fr)
 Golem (Olydri Éditions) de Alexis Talone
 Goultard Bazar (fr)
 Green Mechanic (Ki-oon)
 Head-Trick (fr) 
 Horion
 Kuma Kuma
 Lanfeust Quest
 Lastman 
 Les Iles du vent by Elodie Koeger and Hector Poullet 
 Lost Soul
 Love I.N.C. (fr)
 Magical JanKen Pon (fr)
 Necromancer
 Omega Complex
 Outlaw Players
 Pen Dragon (fr)
 Pepper&Carrot
 Pink Diary (fr)
 Radiant
 La Rose écarlate (fr)
 Save me Pythie (fr)
 Sentaï School (fr)
 Tengu-Dō (fr)
 Les Torches d'Arkylon (fr)
 Vis-à-Vis
 Le Visiteur du futur : La Brigade temporelle (Ankama Éditions) by François Descraques, Guillaume Lapeyre and Alexandre Desmassias
 Vivant Human Specimen (fr)
 Wakfu (Ankama Éditions)

See also 
 La nouvelle manga
 Manga outside Japan
 Original English-language manga, the English-language equivalent
 Anime-influenced animation
 Franco-Belgian comics

References 

Comics formats
French comics
Bandes dessinées
Manga